{{Infobox album
| name       = Analord
| type       = EP
| longtype   = series
| artist     = Richard D. James
| cover      = Analord (Aphex Twin album - cover art).jpg
| alt        =
| released   = December 2004–July 2005
| recorded   = 2003–2005
| venue      =
| studio     =
| genre      = Acid techno
| length     = {{Collapsible list |title=11 EPs |titlestyle=font-weight:normal;width:100%;text-align:left;background:transparent;|1=Analord 01: 21:57 |2=Analord 02: 23:11 |3=Analord 03: 18:44 |4=Analord 04: 18:25 |5=Analord 05: 10:44 |6=Analord 06: 22:58 |7=Analord 07: 20:24 |8=Analord 08: 20:04 |9=Analord 09: 16:34 |10=Analord 10: 12:53 |11=Analord 11: 19:26}}Total: 3:24:04
| label      = Rephlex  ANALORD01 – ANALORD11
| producer   = Richard D. James
| prev_title = 26 Mixes for Cash
| prev_year  = 2003
| next_title = Chosen Lords
| next_year  = 2006
}}Analord is a series of eleven 12" vinyl records released in 2005 by UK-based electronic music artist Richard D. James, primarily under the alias AFX. The series marked James's return to primarily analogue equipment following his computer-oriented programming work in the late 1990s. After their release, James "distilled" the 3½ hour, 42-track series into the 10-track compilation album Chosen Lords (2006), effectively his first full-length release since the 2001 album Drukqs.

On 24 December 2009, the Rephlex Records website began posting unreleased/bonus tracks for the Analord series in MP3 and WAV digital formats.  In all, 21 bonus tracks were added to the series, totalling 62 tracks for a runtime of 4 hours and 36 minutes.

History
The first installment, Analord 10, went on sale through the Rephlex Records website on 15 December 2004, and was packaged in a faux-leather binder with sleeves for housing the rest of the series. It was later re-released as a picture disc. Both pressings of Analord 10 were marketed under James' primary alias Aphex Twin, although other Analord recordings were released under the AFX pseudonym.

A condensed, album-length version of the series, Chosen Lords, was released in 2006.

Musical equipment used
James has programmed a variety of analogue equipment throughout his career. Instruments on Analord include drum machines such as the Roland TR-606, TR-808, and TR-909; sequencers such as the Roland MC-4; and various synthesizers and polysynths, including the Roland SH-101 and Roland TB-303, a Synton Fenix Modular.

Allusions
Tracks on Analord 8, Analord 9, and Analord 11 are named after computer viruses and other malicious software, allegedly to prevent or discourage file sharing.
The images on both sides of Analord 11 feature the Michael Faraday Memorial in Elephant and Castle, London (which is near the disused bank Richard D. James owns). 
 Both sides of Analord 1 feature the Roland MC-4 Microcomposer as the label art.
 Side B of "Analord 4" has a Halibut's eye as the label art, connecting with the track "Halibut Acid".

Track listing

Analord 1
Released 24 January 2005.

Analord 2
Released 24 January 2005.

Analord 3
Released 21 February 2005.

Analord 4
Released 21 February 2005.

Analord 5
Released 14 March 2005.

Analord 6
Released 11 April 2005.

Analord 7
Released 25 April 2005.

Analord 8
Released 9 May 2005.

Analord 9
Released 13 June 2005.

Analord 10
Released 15 December 2004 and credited to Aphex Twin rather than AFX. Re-released as a picture disc on 11 July 2005.

Analord 11
Released 13 June 2005.

* Released on 24 December 2009, only available through download.

References

External links

 Rephlex Analord webpage & Rephlex Analord 10 webpage
 
 
 
 
 
 
 
 
 
 
 

Acid techno albums
2005 EPs
Aphex Twin albums
Rephlex Records EPs
EP series